Fano Airport is an airport in Italy . located 1 km southeast of Fano and 10 km northwest of Mondolfo in the province of Pesaro and Urbino in the Marche region of Italy.

The airport is used for general aviation, with no commercial airline service.

World War II
During World War II Fano Airfield was built by the United States Army Corps of Engineers as a temporary wartime airfield  with a hard earth or pierced steel planking (PSP) runway and parking apron. With few or no permanent structures, tents were used for ground support operations and personnel billeting.   It was used as an operational airfield by the USAAF Twelfth and Fifteenth Air Forces in late 1944 and in 1945 until the end of the war.

With the withdrawal of the US forces, the facility was turned over to the local government in late 1945.

Units assigned
 79th Fighter Group, 5 December 1944 – 20 March 1945 (P-47 Thunderbolt)
 310th Bombardment Group, 7 April-12 August 1945 (B-25 Mitchell)
 57th Bombardment Wing, 7 April–September 1945
 306th Fighter Wing, 5 March-15 July 1945

References

External links

Airports in Italy
Airport
Airfields of the United States Army Air Forces in Italy
Airports established in 1917